Ma Ning (born November 4, 1983) is a female javelin thrower from PR China.Her personal best throw is 62.38 metres, achieved in June 2003 in Shijiazhuang. At the 2004 Summer Olympics she was eliminated in the first round of the javelin throw competition.

She represented her home area of Hebei at the 2005 National Games of China and won the javelin gold medal there.

International competitions

References

1983 births
Living people
Athletes from Hebei
Chinese female javelin throwers
Olympic athletes of China
Athletes (track and field) at the 2004 Summer Olympics
Asian Games medalists in athletics (track and field)
Athletes (track and field) at the 2006 Asian Games
World Athletics Championships athletes for China
Universiade medalists in athletics (track and field)
Asian Games silver medalists for China
Medalists at the 2006 Asian Games
Universiade silver medalists for China
Medalists at the 2005 Summer Universiade
21st-century Chinese women